Platanthera micrantha (formerly P. azorica) or the narrow-lipped butterfly orchid is a species of orchid in the genus Platanthera endemic to the Azores. It is an endangered species and is closely related to P. azorica and P. pollostantha, also endemic to the Azores.

Distribution
It occurs on eight islands of the archipelago but is restricted to small, scattered populations in laurisilva scrub.

Platanthera micrantha is one of the best indicators of semi-natural laurisilva habitats remaining on the Azores.

References

micrantha
Orchids of Europe
Endemic flora of the Azores